Leroy Casey (born January 22, 1973, The Bronx, New York) (originally known as Twist, also known as Casey Lee) served as DJ for the sketch comedy series In Living Color, from 1991 until 1994. He also appeared in the Keenen Ivory Wayans film A Low Down Dirty Shame (1994) as a young police officer, the Wayans Brothers comedy White Chicks (2004) as Tony, along with actor Terry Crews (of the UPN/The CW series Everybody Hates Chris), and in Dance Flick (2009) as the undercover police officer who arrests a student who was freestyling about a murder he committed. Casey, who has been friends with Shawn Wayans since childhood, also appeared with Shawn and Marlon Wayans in a guest appearance in an episode of The WB comedy The Wayans Bros. (he was credited as Casey Lee), UPN's In the House, opposite LL Cool J, and ABC-TV crime drama series NYPD Blue.

In 2010, Casey appeared in an Internet series titled Punanny Diaries, as the character "James".

References

External links
 
 

1973 births
Living people
Male actors from New York City
American DJs
American male television actors
American male film actors
People from the Bronx